Forth Wanderers is an American Indie rock band from Montclair, New Jersey, formed in 2013. The band consists of vocalist, Ava Trilling, guitarist and songwriter Ben Guterl, guitarist Duke Greene, bassist Noah Schifrin and drummer Zach Lorelli. Formed while the members attended Montclair High School, Forth Wanderers self-released their first EP, Mahogany, in 2013, followed by the mini-album Tough Love in 2014. Following moderate success in the DIY scene, including a Twitter shout-out from pop singer Lorde, the group released their second EP, Slop, in 2016. The EP was co-released between Father/Daughter Records in the United States and Marathon Artists in the United Kingdom. In March 2017, the band played South by Southwest.

In 2018, Forth Wanderers signed to indie label Sub Pop and on April 27, 2018, released their debut studio album, Forth Wanderers. The album was produced and recorded in Philadelphia over 5 days in the summer of 2017. It received a 7.7 rating from Pitchfork and placed at #20 on Stereogum's "50 Best Albums of 2018." 

In the summer of 2018, the band was scheduled to go on a U.S. tour to support the album, during which they were slated to play Jack Antonoff's Shadow of the City Festival and Jay-Z's Made in America Festival. The day before the tour was set to begin, on June 26, 2018, the band published a statement written by Trilling to their Facebook and Twitter pages announcing they would be cancelling the tour due to a "recently diagnosed mental health issue." The following month, they published another statement announcing they would be taking a break for the "immediate future."

In May 2019, Trilling wrote an article for Vice where she detailed her experience dealing with a panic disorder while being in a DIY band and further explained her reasoning for cancelling the tour. The band has not released any new music since Forth Wanderers, although songwriter and guitarist Ben Guterl released an EP under the moniker "Ben Special" in 2019.

Discography

Studio albums

Extended plays

Live albums

References 

American indie rock groups
Musical groups from New Jersey	
Sub Pop artists